The West Zone Culture Centre in Udaipur, Rajasthan is one of seven Cultural Zones established by the Government of India to preserve and promote India's traditional cultural heritage. The centre works to retain and develop regional cultural resources, including traditional and tribal arts. It is provided with administrative infrastructure by the Government of India.

General
West Zone Cultural Centre (WZCC) is one of the seven Zonal Cultural Centres in India. It is set up in 1986–87, under the direct initiative of the Ministry of Human Resource Development, Govt. of India. The office of the West Zone Cultural Centre is located at Bagore-ki-Haveli.

Other Regional Cultural Centres of India
 East Zone Cultural Centre, Kolkata
 North Zone Culture Centre, Patiala, Punjab
 North East Zone Cultural Centre, Chümoukedima, Nagaland

See also
 Bagore-ki-Haveli
 Shilpgram

References

External links
 West Zone Cultural Centre Official Website
 Information about West Zone Cultural Centre and Shilpgram.

1986 establishments in Rajasthan
Cultural centres in India
Cultural organisations based in India
Organisations based in Udaipur
Arts organizations established in 1986
Culture of Udaipur